Kuniyuki (written: 國行 or 圀順) is a masculine Japanese given name. Notable people with the name include:

, Japanese sumo wrestler
Kuniyuki Takahashi, Japanese DJ and music producer

Japanese masculine given names